Anthony Francis Aveni (born 1938) is an American academic anthropologist, astronomer, and author, noted in particular for his extensive publications and contributions to the field of archaeoastronomy. With an academic career spanning over four decades, Aveni is recognized for his influence on the development of archaeoastronomy as a discipline in the latter 20th century. He has specialized in the study of ancient astronomical practices in the Americas, and is one of the founders of research into the historical astronomy of pre-Columbian Mesoamerican cultures. He held an endowed chair as the Russell Colgate Distinguished University Professor of Astronomy and Anthropology and Native American Studies at Colgate University, in Hamilton, New York, where he is now an emeritus professor.

He currently resides in Hamilton, New York, with his artist wife Lorraine. He has more than 34 books and 300 research publications to his credit, including three cover articles in Science magazine and key works in The Sciences, American Scientist, American Antiquity, Latin American Antiquity, and The Journal of Archaeological Research. Two of his short pieces have been cited as "notable essays" in the volumes Best American Essays and Best American Science Writing of 2002. He has been awarded research grants by the National Geographic Society, the National Science Foundation and various private foundations for work in both American continents as well as in Europe and the Middle East.

Books
 Skywatchers of Ancient Mexico (University of Texas Press, 1980) (translations in German, Italian, Chinese, Korean, Spanish, Polish, Portuguese)
 World Archaeoastronomy (editor) (Cambridge University Press, 1988)
 Empires of Time (Basic Books, 1989)
 The Lines of Nazca (editor) (American Philosophical Society, 1990)
 Ancient Astronomers (Smithsonian, 1992)
 Conversing With the Planets (Times, Random House, 1992)
 Behind the Crystal Ball (Times, 1996)
 Stairways to the Stars (Wiley, 1997)
 Skywatchers : A Revised and Updated Version of Skywatchers of Ancient Mexico (University of Texas Press, 2001)
 The Book of the Year: A Brief History of Our Seasonal Holidays (Oxford University Press, 2002)
 The Madrid Codex: New Approaches to Understanding an Ancient Maya Manuscript (edited with Gabrielle Vail) (University Press of Colorado, 2004)
 Foundations of New World Cultural Astronomy (Scholastic, 2005)
 The First Americans: Where They Came From and Who They Became (Scholastic, 2005)
 People and the Sky: Our Ancestors and the Cosmos (Thames & Hudson, 2008)
 Foundations of New World Cultural Astronomy: A Reader With Commentary (editor) (University Press of Colorado, 2008)
 Buried Beneath Us: Discovering the Ancient Cities of the Americas (Roaring Brook Press, 2013)
 The End of Time: The Maya Mystery of 2012 (University Press of Colorado, 2009)

Distinctions
 The Alumni Award for Excellence in Teaching (1997)
 The Phi Eta Sigma National Honor Society Distinguished Teaching Award (1990)
 The highest national award for Teaching - Colgate University
 The National Professor of the Year - Council for the Advancement and Support of Éducation
 The H.B. Nicholson Award for Excellence in Mesoamerican Studies - The Peabody Museum and the Moses Mesoamerican Archive at Harvard Université9 (2004)
 The Fryxell Medal for Interdisciplinary Research - The Society of American Archaeologists (2013)

References

External links
 
 Faculty profile, Colgate University
 
 Institute for Cross Disciplinary Engagement At Dartmouth 
Winslow Lecture to Focus on Prehistoric Astronome Holly Foster Holly (January 29, 2013) 
Experts: Teen's 'Discovery' of Maya City is a Very Western Mistake Kristin Romy (May 11, 2016) 

Archaeoastronomers
Historians of astronomy
American astronomers
American anthropologists
American Mesoamericanists
Mesoamerican anthropologists
20th-century Mesoamericanists
21st-century Mesoamericanists
Mayanists
Colgate University faculty
1938 births
Living people